The City of Malvern was a local government area about  southeast of Melbourne, the state capital of Victoria, Australia.

History

Malvern was incorporated as the Gardiner Road District on 17 October 1856, which became the Shire of Gardiner on 26 May 1871. It was renamed the Shire of Malvern on 15 February 1878. It then became a borough on 22 February 1901, a town on 24 April 1901 and a city on 30 May 1911.

On 22 June 1994, the City of Malvern was abolished, and along with the City of Prahran, was merged into the newly created City of Stonnington.

Council meetings were held at the Malvern Town Hall, at Glenferrie Road and High Street, Malvern. It presently serves as a service centre for the City of Stonnington.

Mayors

Wards

The City of Malvern was subdivided in October 1980 into four wards — Centre, East, North and South — each electing three councillors.

Suburbs
 Armadale (shared with the City of Prahran)
 Glen Iris (shared with the City of Camberwell)
 Kooyong
 Malvern
 Malvern East
 Toorak (shared with the City of Prahran)

* Council seat.

Population

* Estimate in the 1958 Victorian Year Book.

References

External links
 Victorian Places - Malvern

Malvern
City of Stonnington
1994 disestablishments in Australia
1856 establishments in Australia